Prometheus is an active volcano on Jupiter's moon Io.

Description 
Prometheus consists of a -wide volcanic pit named Prometheus Patera and a -long compound lava flow, all surrounded by reddish sulfur and circular, bright sulfur dioxide volcanic plume deposits.  The volcano was first observed in images acquired by the Voyager 1 spacecraft in March 1979.  Later that year, the International Astronomical Union named this feature after a Greek fire god, Prometheus.

Prometheus is the site of a volcanic eruption that has been ongoing since at least the Voyager 1 encounter in 1979.  Between the Voyager encounters and the first observations by Galileo, a  flow field was emplaced.   Later Galileo observations of this flow field revealed numerous small breakouts, particularly on the western end of the flow field.

Prometheus is the site of two volcanic eruption plumes: a small, sulfur-rich plume erupting from the magma-source vent at the eastern end of the flow field and a -tall, -rich dust plume erupting from the active flow front at the other end.  The former forms a diffuse, red deposit to the east of the Prometheus flow field.  The latter forms a bright, circular deposit surrounding the entire volcano and lava flow.  The -rich plume is generated as lava at the western end of the flow field covers sulfur dioxide frost, heating and vaporizing it.  This is accomplished at multiple breakouts, generating gas and dust for the visible dust plume.  Prometheus' plume has been observed by both Voyager spacecraft, Galileo, and New Horizons, at every appropriate imaging opportunity.

References

Volcanoes of Io (moon)
Prometheus
Active volcanoes